The 2012–13 Macedonian Third Football League was the 21st season of the third-tier football league in the Republic of Macedonia, since its establishment. It began in August 2012 and ended in June 2013.

North

Teams

League table

South

Teams

League table

East

Teams

League table

West

Teams

League table

Southwest

Teams

League table

See also
2012–13 Macedonian Football Cup
2012–13 Macedonian First Football League
2012–13 Macedonian Second Football League

External links
MacedonianFootball.com
Football Federation of Macedonia 

Macedonia 3
3
Macedonian Third Football League seasons